Peacemaker is the name of a series of fictional characters originally owned by Charlton Comics and later acquired by DC Comics. The original Peacemaker first appeared in Fightin' 5 #40 (November 1966) and was created by writer Joe Gill and artist Pat Boyette.

John Cena portrayed the Christopher Smith version of Peacemaker in the 2021 DC Extended Universe film The Suicide Squad, and in the 2022 self-titled television series on HBO Max.

Publication history
The Peacemaker first appeared as a backup series in Charlton Comics' espionage-team title Fightin' 5 #40 (November 1966). When that series was canceled with issue #41, Peacemaker received his own title lasting five issues cover-dated March to November 1967, with Fightin' 5 as a backup series and later a low reprint run on the Modern Comics imprint. Some of penciler-inker Pat Boyette's artwork for a projected sixth issue later appeared online. Following Charlton Comics' demise in the mid-1980s, DC Comics acquired The Peacemaker and released a four-issue mini-series (January–April 1988).

Fictional character biography

Christopher Smith I
The Peacemaker is Christopher Smith, a pacifist diplomat so committed to peace that he was willing to use force as a superhero to advance the cause. He uses an array of special non-lethal weapons, and also founded the Pax Institute.  Most of the villains he goes up against are dictators and warlords. 

The post-Crisis on Infinite Earths version of Peacemaker differs slightly from the pre-Crisis version of the character. Smith learns that his peace-through-violence efforts were the result of a serious mental illness brought on by the shame of having a Nazi death camp commandant for a father. He believes his father's spirit haunts him continually and criticizes his every move, even as he tries to live down his past.

Becoming a particularly deadly vigilante who would kill at the slightest provocation, he begins to believe that the ghosts of the people he killed, or who were killed in his vicinity, are collected inside his helmet and can offer him advice and commentary. For a time, the Peacemaker serves as a U.S. government agent under the auspices of Checkmate, a special-forces unit, hunting down terrorists until his own behavior becomes too extreme. Peacemaker plays a part in the Janus Directive. Although he is seen as a helpful ally, some of the other heroes think that he is too extreme to be helping them out. He eventually crashes a helicopter to destroy tanks controlled by the supervillain Eclipso and is reported dead. His soul shows up in the realm of Purgatory in the Day of Judgment series. A team of heroes has shown up to recruit the soul of Hal Jordan. The guardians of Purgatory do not like this and Peacemaker, along with other dead vigilantes, rally and provide enough of a distraction so the group could return to Earth.

Peacemaker later appears in the Watchmen sequel "Doomsday Clock", partaking in the battle on Mars against Doctor Manhattan.

In the pages of "Infinite Frontier", Peacemaker returns as a member of the Suicide Squad, breaking into Arkham Asylum to bring in Talon a few minutes before the Joker Incident.

Peacemaker - Justice League International
Another operative using the name Peacemaker appeared only once, in Justice League International #65, as a member of the "League-Busters".

Mitchell Black
Mitchell Black, a surgeon, was recruited by the "Peacemaker Project", an organization unaffiliated with the Pax Institute and the US government's "Project Peacemaker". Black would reappear in the miniseries titled The L.A.W., reunited with the other heroes acquired from Charlton. As a team, they investigated a powerful being targeting military facilities.

He appeared to have been killed by the supervillain Prometheus in Infinite Crisis #7 during a battle to save Metropolis from destruction.

Peacemaker - Blue Beetle
Another individual appearing in the pre-"Flashpoint" Blue Beetle series has claimed both Smith's name and the Peacemaker identity, both things confirmed by several hints, such as his catchphrase of "loving peace so much, he'd kill for it", spoken by La Dama to define him. However, divested of his trademark helmet, he was shown using the 'Mitchell Black' identity before settling again on his real name. A year prior to his meeting with the Blue Beetle (Jaime Reyes), during a fight against Intergang, he found himself in a Bialyan pyramid that happened to be the same one the first Blue Beetle, Dan Garrett, found the scarab in years before. While inside, he accidentally came into contact with alien technology that allowed him to receive the scarab's database in his mind, explaining the inability of the Reach to control Garrett and Reyes. The Scarab was taken away with only a partly functioning AI with the higher instructions, including the ones needed to control the host, left in the pyramid and downloaded into Smith's mind.

Sensing the connection, he sought out Jaime, initially to see if the boy would become a threat but eventually becoming a reluctant partner. Upon witnessing Jaime's rebellion, the Reach implanted Peacemaker with a scarab himself, which was dormant until a Sinestro Corps Power Ring contacted the AI and assigned him control of Space Sector 2, including the Reach Empire. He was sent to kill Jaime, but Jaime interfaced with Smith's scarab and helped him face his inner fears. Gathering enough courage for a last stand, Smith forcibly cut the scarab from his spine, leaving him injured but not dead. He helped defend Jaime's family from a Reach attack, and has continued to serve as a sort of mentor to the third Blue Beetle. At the conclusion of the Blue Beetle volume, Peacemaker leaves El Paso. Before he departs, he bids farewell to Jaime and advises him to learn to become his own man.

Later, he makes an appearance in Final Crisis Aftermath: Escape as a detainee and potential recruit of the Global Peace Agency.

Other versions

Kingdom Come
The Peacemaker was briefly shown in flashbacks in Alex Ross and Mark Waid's comic Kingdom Come as a member of Magog's Justice Battalion, along with the rest of the Charlton "Action Heroes". In them, he is wearing an outfit more reminiscent of Boba Fett. He was apparently killed with the other team members when Captain Atom exploded.

Watchmen
The character was used as an inspiration and influence for The Comedian in Alan Moore's Watchmen.

52
In the final issue of the 2006 - 2007 series 52, a new Multiverse is revealed, originally consisting of 52 identical realities. Among the parallel realities shown is one designated "Earth-4". As a result of Mister Mind "eating" aspects of this reality, it takes on visual aspects similar to the pre-Crisis Earth-4, including Peacemaker and the other Charlton characters. The names of the characters are not mentioned in the panel in which they appear. Based on comments by Grant Morrison, this alternate universe is not the pre-Crisis Earth-4.

Pax Americana
In Pax Americana, the fourth issue of Grant Morrison's Multiversity series and set on Earth-4, Peacemaker is one of the protagonists, along with Blue Beetle, The Question, Captain Atom, Nightshade and Judomaster; Sarge Steel also makes a mostly off-panel appearance.

Vigilante
In the thirty-sixth issue of Vigilante, written by Paul Kupperberg set on New Earth . Peacemaker appears along with Dave Winston (Vigilante) to battle terrorists hijacking a plane. After the mission was succeeded, Dave lays a hand on Peacemaker in which he gets enraged and blown away.

In other media

DC Extended Universe

The Christopher Smith incarnation of Peacemaker appears in the live-action DC Extended Universe film The Suicide Squad and a self-titled spin-off HBO Max television series, portrayed by John Cena.

Video games
 Both the Christopher Smith and Mitchell Black incarnations of Peacemaker appear in Scribblenauts Unmasked: A DC Comics Adventure.
 Peacemaker appears as an emote in Fortnite Battle Royale.

References

External links
 Peacemaker at International Superheroes
 Peacemaker at Comics101
 Keith Giffen verifies identity of the new Peacemaker
 Index to the Earth-4 adventures of the Charlton Action Heroes

1967 comics debuts
Characters created by Joe Gill
Charlton Comics superheroes
Charlton Comics titles
Comics characters introduced in 1966
DC Comics American superheroes
DC Comics male superheroes
DC Comics titles
Comics by Paul Kupperberg
Fictional diplomats
Fictional shield fighters
Fictional pacifists
 
Suicide Squad members
United States-themed superheroes
Vigilante characters in comics
DC Comics television characters